The Criminal Code is a 1931 American pre-Code romantic crime drama film directed by Howard Hawks and starring Walter Huston and Phillips Holmes. The screenplay, based on a 1929 play of the same name by Martin Flavin, was written by Fred Niblo Jr. and Seton I. Miller, who were nominated for Best Adaptation at the 4th Academy Awards but the award went to Howard Estabrook for Cimarron.

The film is the first of three film adaptations of the play released by Columbia Pictures. It was followed by Penitentiary (1938) and Convicted (1950).

Plot
Six years of hard labor in the prison jute mill has taken its toll on young Graham, convicted of manslaughter after a drunken brawl. The penitentiary's doctor and psychiatrist recommends that he be offered a change of duties before psychological damage become irreversible. When the warden recalls that it was he, as district attorney, that helped put him behind bars, he makes him his valet. Graham enjoys the change, especially the company of the warden's pretty young daughter, Mary.

One of Graham's cellmates tries to escape with two others but one is a stool pigeon and inadvertently gives away the plan. The guards shoot dead one escapee. Ned Galloway, Graham's other cellmate, vows to avenge this death, planning to murder the informer and warning Graham to stay away from him. However, Graham walks in on the crime. Despite finding him with the body, the warden believes that Graham is not the murderer but knows who is. Promising him parole, the warden demands the name of the killer. Graham remains loyal to the Prisoner's Code of silence so the warden sends him to "the hole," hoping it will change his mind.

Mary returns from a trip and is shocked when she finds out Graham has been punished. She proclaims her love for him and urges his release. The warden promises to do so but meanwhile Captain Gleason is putting pressure on Graham to confess. Galloway is grateful that Graham has stayed true and arranges to be sent to the hole and protect him by killing Gleason, for whom he had a longstanding grudge.

Cast
 Walter Huston as Mark Brady
 Phillips Holmes as Robert Graham
 Constance Cummings as Mary Brady
 Boris Karloff as Ned Galloway
 DeWitt Jennings as Yard Captain Gleason
 Mary Doran as Gertrude Williams
 Ethel Wales as Katie Ryan
 Clark Marshall as Runch
 Arthur Hoyt as Leonard Nettleford
 John St. Polis as Dr Rinewulf
 Paul Porcasi as Tony Spelvin
 Otto Hoffman as Jim Fales
 John Sheehan as McManus

Production
The Criminal Code, based on a successful play by Martin Flavin.
The Criminal Code was adapted for the screen by Seton I. Miller and Fred Niblo, Jr., son of director Fred Niblo. The original play by San Francisco Bay Area native author and playwright Martin Flavin was produced on Broadway in 1929 at the Belasco Theater. Boris Karloff, who delivered a strong performance in the stage play, is recast here as Galloway. This film accelerated his career: though appearing in dozens of pictures during the 1920s, he had mostly been cast in bit parts.

The Criminal Code was the first of Hawks' four collaborations with Harry Cohn, the others being Twentieth Century (1934), Only Angels Have Wings (1939) and His Girl Friday (1940). It is Hawks' only picture with Frank Fouce, who produced only five films, all released in 1931. Hawks worked with screenwriter Seton Miller several times in the late 1920s and early 1930s. This is the only occasion he worked with Niblo, Jr. Stock footage from the film was used by Columbia in the following year's Behind the Mask, which also featured Cummings and Karloff, but in different roles.

Analysis
Though an early talkie, The Criminal Code makes a sophisticated use of sound. The intercourse is at times rapid and Hawks uses the emerging technique of overlapping dialogue.

Like other prison films of the 1930s, such as San Quentin (1937) and Each Dawn I Die (1939), The Criminal Code encouraged its viewers to question the contemporary American legal and penal systems.

Hawks exploits the prison genre to illustrate the male friendship and 'group as an organic force' themes often present in his works (cf. Only Angels Have Wings, Rio Bravo, 1959). This is most apparent in the scene in which Brady starts his first day of work as warden, greeted by a prison yard full of men booing him as if they were but one man. The warden (and the camera) peer down on them from the office window.

Constance Cummings represents the typical strong and stoic Hawksian woman. She inhabits a masculine world yet prefers to stay and live at the penitentiary.

Adaptations

Radio
The Criminal Code was presented on Philip Morris Playhouse March 2, 1952. The 30-minute adaptation starred Dane Clark and University of Minnesota student Peggy Baskerville.

Foreign-language versions
A Spanish-language version entitled El código penal was directed by Phil Rosen, which stars Barry Norton, María Alba, and Carlos Villarías. It had its world premiere in Mexico City on February 19, 1931, followed by its American opening in San Juan, Puerto Rico on March 14, and the New York opening on April 14, 1931.

A French version entitled Criminel was produced in 1932 by Forrester-Parant Productions, and directed by Jack Forrester. It stars Harry Baur and Jean Servais, and made use of certain scenes from the English-language version.

Remakes
Columbia Pictures remade the picture as Penitentiary (1938). It was directed by John Brahm starring Walter Connolly and John Howard.

The film was remade again by Columbia as Convicted (1950), directed by Henry Levin, and starring Glenn Ford and Broderick Crawford.

References

External links
 
 
 
 
 New York Times review (January 5, 1931)
 Under the Cover of Darkness: Expressionistic Experimentation in Howard Hawks' The Criminal Code, an article by Christopher Weedman, at Senses of Cinema.

1931 films
1931 crime drama films
1930s prison films
1931 romantic drama films
American black-and-white films
American crime drama films
American films based on plays
American prison drama films
American romantic drama films
Columbia Pictures films
1930s English-language films
Films directed by Howard Hawks
Romantic crime films
1930s American films